The Opéra national de Montpellier Languedoc-Roussillon is an opera company located in the Place de la Comédie in Montpellier, France.

The company was established in 1755 and was granted the status of "National Opera" in 2002 by the French Ministry of Culture.

The company uses two main buildings for its performances.  The Opéra Comédie, built in the Italian style and opened in 1888, houses a 1,200-seat main auditorium and the 350-seat Salle Molière concert hall. The interior of the Italian-style opera house, built from 1884-88 by Cassien Bernard, a pupil of Charles Garnier, has been noted by critics. Since 1990, the company has also performed at the 2,000-seat Opéra Berlioz in the Le Corum arts complex.

The orchestra of the opera is the Orchestre national de Montpellier Languedoc-Roussillon.

References

External links

Opéra national de Montpellier Languedoc-Roussillon website.

French opera companies
Organizations based in Montpellier
1755 establishments in France
Tourist attractions in Montpellier
Musical groups from Occitania (administrative region)